Yvonne Elkuch (born 31 March 1968) is Liechtensteiner cyclist who came 47th in the road race at the 1992 Summer Olympics in Barcelona, Spain. She also competed at the 1988 Summer Olympics in Seoul, South Korea, 17th place, where she carried the flag for Liechtenstein at the opening ceremony.

References

1968 births
Living people
Liechtenstein female cyclists
Cyclists at the 1988 Summer Olympics
Cyclists at the 1992 Summer Olympics
Olympic cyclists of Liechtenstein
People from Altstätten